Madonna and Child Enthroned with Two Virgin Martyrs is an oil on panel painting by Cima da Conegliano, created in 1495, now in the Memphis Brooks Museum of Art.

References

Paintings of the Madonna and Child by Cima da Conegliano
1495 paintings